The Masks of Death is a 1984 British mystery television film directed by Roy Ward Baker and starring Peter Cushing as Sherlock Holmes and John Mills as Doctor Watson.

Plot

In 1913, Sherlock Holmes, virtually in retirement, is persuaded by Inspector Alec MacDonald of Scotland Yard to take on a baffling case. Three dead bodies have been found in London's East End, all with no discernible cause of death, but the expressions on their faces suggest that they all died in a state of terror.

Holmes, accompanied by Dr Watson, begins an investigation, but before he can make any real progress he is visited by the British Home Secretary and a German Diplomat, Count Udo von Felseck, who tell Holmes that a German envoy, on a secret mission to Britain, has disappeared from Felseck's house in Buckinghamshire.  Unless Holmes can track him down, war between the two countries will become imminent. Holmes considers the possibility that the two matters are related and that someone is not telling him the truth.

Cast
Peter Cushing as Sherlock Holmes 
John Mills as Doctor Watson 
Anne Baxter as Irene Adler 
Ray Milland as Home Secretary 
Anton Diffring as Count Udo von Felseck 
Gordon Jackson as Inspector Alec MacDonald 
Susan Penhaligon as Miss Derwent 
Marcus Gilbert as Anton von Felseck 
Jenny Laird as Mrs. Hudson 
Russell Hunter as Alfred Coombs 
James Cossins as Frederick Baines 
Eric Dodson as Lord Claremont 
Georgina Coombs as Lady Claremont
Dominic St Clair as Boot Boy

Production

Development
Executive producer Kevin Francis had previously attempted to raise funds for a new version of The Hound of the Baskervilles. Francis intended to cast Peter Cushing as Holmes, which would be Cushing's third take on the Doyle tale after the 1959 Hammer production and the two-part production for the 1968 television series, and feature a stop-motion dog created by Ray Harryhausen.

While funding for the proposed film collapsed, it led to Francis discussing an original tale with writer Anthony Hinds.

Casting
This is Peter Cushing's final portrayal of Sherlock Holmes. He first donned Holmes' deerstalker in Hammer's The Hound of the Baskervilles (1959). Later, he took over from Douglas Wilmer in the BBC television series Sir Arthur Conan Doyle's Sherlock Holmes in the late 1960s. Cushing considered Sherlock Holmes to be his favorite role but his age, Cushing being in his 70s, required the part to be written for a much older Holmes.

Filming
Filming began in the summer of 1984 at Twickenham Film Studios with location work at Buckinghamshire and London.

Unproduced sequel
There were plans for a follow-up titled The Abbot's Cry but the film never materialized due to Cushing's declining health.

References

External links

 

Sherlock Holmes films
1984 television films
1984 films
British television films
British mystery films
Films directed by Roy Ward Baker
Films set in 1913
Sherlock Holmes pastiches
Films scored by Malcolm Williamson
1980s British films